UAS may refer to:

People
Abdul Somad

Education
 Undergraduate Ambassadors Scheme, UK
 University of Agricultural Sciences (disambiguation)
 University of Alaska Southeast
 University of Alabama System
 University of Applied Sciences
 University of Agricultural Sciences, Dharwad
 Universidad Autónoma de Sinaloa, or Autonomous University of Sinaloa
 Uruguayan American School
 Acronym for University of Applied Sciences

Science and technology
 Unidentified aerial system, a military term for an unidentified flying object used for unknown aircraft. 
 Unmanned aircraft system, which includes a UAV (or drone) and a ground control station
 Upstream activating sequence, a genetic sequence
 USB Attached SCSI
 User Agent Server, part of the Session Initiation Protocol
 User agent String, text sent over HTTP to identify a web client
 Unity Asset Server, a tool for the  Unity game engine

Other uses
 University Air Squadron
 United Arab States, a former union between the United Arab Republic (Egypt and Syria) and North Yemen

See also
 UAR (disambiguation)